The Higgins Doctors Office Building is a historic commercial building at 1207-1211 E. Main St. in Richmond, Virginia.  Built in 1954, it is a distinctive and unusual example of a round commercial building.  It is a single story in height, with a flat roof. Its exterior walls are a combination of glass windows and concrete blocks with cross motif, with outside courtyard terraces.  The entrances are set in recesses.  The property's landscape continues a circular theme, with flower beds, fencing, and parking arranged in concentric patterns around the structure.  It was designed by the Washington, DC firm of Deigert & Yerkes.

The building was listed on the National Register of Historic Places in 2017.

See also
National Register of Historic Places listings in Richmond, Virginia

References

Commercial buildings on the National Register of Historic Places in Virginia
Commercial buildings completed in 1954
Buildings and structures in Richmond, Virginia
National Register of Historic Places in Richmond, Virginia
Round buildings